Malou Ejdesgaard (born 13 March 1991) is a retired Danish tennis player.

She was a member of the Denmark Fed Cup team from 2010 until just before her retirement in 2014.

Professional career
Ejdesgaard made her WTA Tour debut playing the qualifying for the 2007 Nordic Light Open, but lost to domestic player Aleksandra Srdinović, 4–6, 4–6. In 2008, in the first round of qualifying at the China Open, she lost to Zhang Shuai, 1–6, 2–6.

She received a wildcard to play at the 2008 Danish Open and lost to Jasmina Tinjić in round one.

2010
In April 2010, Ejdesgaard lost in the first qualifying round of the MPS Group Championships to Arina Rodionova, 3–6, 6–7. She also failed to qualify for the Slovenia Open.

She made her professional singles debut at the WTA Tour event Danish Open, losing to Tatjana Malek in the first round 0–6, 1–6.

Ejdesgaard won four $10k doubles tournaments in 2010. She suffered a season-ending knee injury in September, but made a full recovery and returned to playing tennis on the ITF Circuit in May 2011.

2011
Ejdesgaard received a wildcard to play at the Danish Open once again, but lost to Bethanie Mattek-Sands in round one.

She was most successful in doubles play on the ITF Circuit and won a number of doubles titles, including the events at Alcobaça and Valladolid.

2012
For the fourth time, she got a wildcard for the Danish Open, but was double-bageled by Alizé Cornet in the first round.

She reached the doubles final of the ITF event in Aschaffenburg with Réka Luca Jani, losing to Florencia Molinero and Stephanie Vogt.

2014
On 11 May, Ejdesgaard announced her retirement from the tour, saying she'd only play national and club games.

Personal life
Ejdesgaard is a close friend of former world No. 1 tennis player Caroline Wozniacki, her Danish teammate, with whom she also plays some WTA Tour tournaments. They tried to gain an entry to the 2012 Summer Olympics in doubles. Ejdesgaard has played with Wozniacki in five tournaments – in 2008 at Odense, in 2010 at Ponte Vedra Beach, Charleston & Copenhagen, and in 2011 at Copenhagen. They lost in the first round and twice in the second round, respectively.

ITF finals

Singles: 1 (0–1)

Doubles: 18 (7–11)

Fed Cup performances

Singles

Doubles

References

External links
 
 
 

1991 births
Danish female tennis players
Danish people of Faroese descent
Living people
Sportspeople from Copenhagen